Comastoma is a genus of flowering plants belonging to the family Gentianaceae.

Its native range is Temperate Asia to Himalaya.

Species:
 Comastoma cyananthiflorum (Franch.) Holub 
 Comastoma dechyanum (Sommier & Levier) Holub

References

Gentianaceae
Gentianaceae genera